The Galaure is a  long river in the Isère and Drôme departments in southeastern France. Its source is in Roybon. It flows generally west-southwest. It is a left tributary of the Rhône, into which it flows at Saint-Vallier.

Departments and communes along its course
This list is ordered from source to mouth: 
 Isère: Roybon, Saint-Pierre-de-Bressieux, Montfalcon, 
 Drôme: Montrigaud, 
 Isère:Saint-Clair-sur-Galaure, 
 Drôme: Le Grand-Serre, Hauterives, Châteauneuf-de-Galaure, Mureils, La Motte-de-Galaure, Saint-Barthélemy-de-Vals, Saint-Uze, Saint-Vallier,

References

Rivers of France
Rivers of Auvergne-Rhône-Alpes
Rivers of Isère
Rivers of Drôme